SchlagerTV is a Schlager music television channel aimed at the European and North-American markets which launched in January, 2009. The programming consists mainly of music videos and music programs in the German language. The main music genre is the popular Schlager music genre from Germany and Austria. The channel is founded by Jur Bron and Gerard Ardesch and officially owned by their company TV Digitaal BV. In December 2011, the Brava TV Group announced that Strengholt BV became co-owner of SchlagerTV, though sister channel TV Oranje remains solely owned by TV Digitaal BV. Since 12 May 2016 it is part of MuziekKiosk.

See also
 Television in the Netherlands
 Digital television in the Netherlands

References

External links
 www.schlagertv.nl

Television channels in the Netherlands
Television channels and stations established in 2009
Mass media in Naarden